K3 en het Magische Medaillon is a 2004 children's comedy film starring girl band K3 – Kathleen Aerts, Karen Damen and Kristel Verbeke – in their first full-length theater film.

Plot

Cast

Main 
 Kathleen Aerts...Kathleen
 Karen Damen...Karen
 Kristel Verbeke...Kristel

Supporting 
 Paul de Leeuw...The Ghost (from the Medaillon)
 Eddy Vereycken...Red Tiger
 Daisy Ip...Black Panter
 Peter Rouffaer...Gazpacho
 Tom De Hoog...Police officer
 Angele De Backer...La Mama (Gazapacho's mother)
 Nicolas Vander Biest...Halewijn Van Helewout

Minor 
 Nadja Schrauwen
 Ilke Siera
 André van Cleemput-Wils
 Annie van Cleemput-Wils

DVD 
The Video DVD was released in early 2005.

External7 links 
 

2004 films
Belgian children's films
Dutch children's films
2000s Dutch-language films